Pierre Boël (4 July 1911 – 25 May 1968) was a French basketball player. He competed in the men's tournament at the 1936 Summer Olympics.

References

1911 births
1968 deaths
French men's basketball players
Olympic basketball players of France
Basketball players at the 1936 Summer Olympics
Sportspeople from Nord (French department)